INS Virbahu is an Indian Navy submarine base of the Eastern Naval Command located near Visakhapatnam, Andhra Pradesh.

History
INS Virbahu was commissioned as the shore support base for submarines on 19 May 1971. With the commissioning of INS Virbahu the 8th Submarine Squadron of Vela  class submarines was based here. The Commanding Officer INS Virbahu was also designated as the Captain submarines 8th Submarine Squadron. Thereafter, with the induction of the Sindhughosh class submarines, the 11th Submarine Squadron was created. As two Submarine Squadrons were based at Visakhapatnam, comprising eight submarines, the scope of responsibility of the Commanding Officer, INS Virbahu, increased many fold. The submarines were thus placed under the operational control of Captain Submarines, 8th and 11th Submarine Squadron. With the increase of the number and type of submarines the operational authority of Submarine Squadrons was elevated from Captain Submarines to Commodore Submarines in Apr 1990. Since the appointment of the Commodore Submarines had a command responsibility towards the submarines the appointment was thus re-christened as Commodore Commanding Submarines (East) in Jun 1997. Initially all training, maintenance, operational and logistic matters pertaining to submarines were dealt by Virbahu. As the Arm expanded, the training role was taken over by INS Satavahana and the Class Authority functions by Submarine Headquarters. But the attachment to the old Alma Mater persists and Virbahu continues to be regarded as the 'Home of the Dolphins' even today.

Objective 
The role of INS Virbahu is to provide administrative and logistic support to the 8th and 11th Submarine Squadrons. It also provides accommodation, messing, welfare and recreational facilities to the crews of submarines as applicable. INS Virbahu is the seat of the Commodore Commanding Submarines (East) (COMCOS (W)). The COMCOS is also the commanding officer of the base.

See also
 Indian Navy 
 Commodore Commanding Submarines (East)
 INS Vajrabahu
 List of Indian Navy bases
 List of active Indian Navy ships

 Integrated commands and units
 Armed Forces Special Operations Division
 Defence Cyber Agency
 Integrated Defence Staff
 Integrated Space Cell
 Indian Nuclear Command Authority
 Indian Armed Forces
 Special Forces of India

 Other lists
 Strategic Forces Command
 List of Indian Air Force stations
 List of Indian Navy bases
 India's overseas military bases

References

Virbahu